The Australian Harness Horse of the Year is an honour that recognises the top harness racing horse in the Australia. The award is selected by industry people and media representatives. 

The inaugural award was won in 1976 by Don't Retreat, a New South Wales pacer who won 14 of his 24 starts in the 1975-1976 season for a total of $122,415.
The first and only trotter to win the award was Maori's Idol in 1978, a season in which he won 22 of his 24 starts. The first three-year-old to win the award was a year later in 1979, when Run Joe Run won the award, since then a three-year-old has won the award three times. The youngest horse to win the award was Lombo Pocket Watch who won as a two-year-old in 2006.

The horses that has won the most awards are Westburn Grant, who won the award in 1989 as a three-year-old and again in 1991 and 1992, Our Sir Vancelot, who won the 1997, 1998 and 1999 awards and four time Interdominion winner Blacks A Fake in 2007, 2008 and 2010. Smoken Up was the original winner of the 2011 award but became ineligible due to his disqualification from the Inter Dominion.

Past winners
Horses that have been crowned Australian Harness Horse of the Year are:

See also

 A G Hunter Cup
 Australian Pacing Championship
 Inter Dominion Pacing Championship
 Miracle Mile Pace
 New Zealand Trotting Cup
 Queensland Pacing Championship
  Victoria Cup
 Harness racing in Australia
 Harness racing in New Zealand

References

Horse racing awards